Sidney Herbert Sugden (30 October 1880 – 17 December 1930) was an English football forward who played in the Football League for Nottingham Forest. He also played in the Southern League for Queens Park Rangers, Brentford and West Ham United.

Career statistics

References

Footballers from Battersea
English footballers
Brentford F.C. players
English Football League players
1880 births
Ilford F.C. players
Association football forwards
West Ham United F.C. players
Nottingham Forest F.C. players
Queens Park Rangers F.C. players
Southend United F.C. players
Southern Football League players
1930 deaths